Thieves and Poets is an album by John McLaughlin, released in 2003 through the record label Verve. The album reached number twenty on Billboard's Top Jazz Albums chart.

Track listing
All tracks composed by John McLaughlin; except where indicated
 "Thieves and Poets, Pt. 1" – 12:32
 "Thieves and Poets, Pt. 2" – 8:15
 "Thieves and Poets, Pt. 3" – 5:38
 "My Foolish Heart" (Ned Washington, Victor Young) – 5:03
 "The Dolphin" (Luiz Eça) – 4:16
 "Stella by Starlight" (Washington, Young) – 4:27
 "My Romance" (Lorenz Hart, Richard Rodgers) – 4:09

Personnel
 Helmut Schartlmüller — bass
 John McLaughlin — guitar
 Matt Haimovitz — cello
 Yan Maresz — Orchestration, Sound Design
 Paul Meyer — clarinet
 Viktoria Mullova — violin

Other credits
 Guido Andreani — assistant engineer
 Pascal Bod — release coordinator
 Peppe de Angelis — assistant engineer
 Thomas Dorn — cover photo
 Lïla Guilloteau — assistant coordinator
 Ira McLaughlin — photography
 Maureen Murphy — release coordinator
 John Newcott — release coordinator
 Christian Pégand — production coordination
 Renato Rivolta — conductor
 Christoph Stickel — mastering 
 Marcus Wippersberg — recording, mixing

Chart performance

References

External links
 

2003 albums
John McLaughlin (musician) albums
Verve Records albums